Heng Chee How (born 1961) is a Singaporean politician, union leader and former police officer who has been serving as Senior Minister of State for Defence since 2018 and Deputy Secretary-General of the National Trade Union Congress since 1999. A member of the governing People's Action Party (PAP), he has been the Member of Parliament (MP) representing the Whampoa division of Jalan Besar GRC since 2001.

Prior to entering politics, Heng had worked at the Singapore Police Force (SPF) and National Trades Union Congress (NTUC). 

He made his political debut in the 1997 general election as a solo PAP candidate contesting in Hougang SMC against the Workers' Party's Low Thia Khiang. He lost to Low, who won 58.02% of the vote against his 41.98%. 

During the 2001 general election, Heng joined the five-member PAP team contesting in Jalan Besar GRC and won with 74.48% of the vote. Heng was elected as the Member of Parliament representing the Whampoa ward of Jalan Besar GRC. Since then, he had retained his parliamentary seat in subsequent elections and had served as Minister of State and later Senior Minister of State in various ministries. He also served as Deputy Leader of the House in Parliament between 2011 and 2015.

Early life and education
Born in a Chinese Singaporean of Teochew descent family, Heng was educated at Raffles Institution before graduating from Fitzwilliam College, Cambridge at the University of Cambridge in 1983 with a Bachelor of Arts with second upper class honours (later promoted to Master of Arts by seniority) degree in economics under an undergraduate scholarship conferred by the Singapore Police Force (SPF) in 1980. 

He subsequently went on to complete a Master of Public Administration degree at Harvard University's John F. Kennedy School of Government in 1992 under a postgraduate scholarship conferred by the Singapore Police Force (SPF). 

Heng was also awarded the Edward S. Mason Fellowship in 1990, Lucius Littauer Fellowship Award from the John F. Kennedy School of Government in 1992 and Eisenhower Fellowship in 2001.

Career
Heng started his career in 1983 in the Singapore Police Force (SPF) and held command and staff appointments, including Director of Manpower and Commander of the Geylang Police Division. 

He left the SPF in 1995 to join the National Trades Union Congress (NTUC) and took up various positions in the labour movement, including Chief Executive Officer of the NTUC Club (1995–1998), Executive Secretary of the Singapore Industrial and Services Employees Union, Executive Secretary of the United Workers of Electronic and Electrical Industries, and Divisional Director overseeing industrial relations, skills development, productivity improvement and employment assistance. 

He became Assistant Secretary-General of the NTUC in 1997. In 1999, he was promoted to Deputy Secretary-General of the NTUC has held that position since then.

Political career
Heng made his political debut in the 1997 general election when he contested as a solo candidate from the People's Action Party (PAP) in Hougang SMC against the incumbent opposition Member of Parliament, Low Thia Khiang of the Workers' Party. He lost to Low, who won 58.02% of the vote against his 41.98%.

In the 2001 general election, Heng contested again as a PAP candidate, this time in Jalan Besar GRC, as part of a five-member PAP team. The PAP team won with 74.48% of the vote against the Singapore Democratic Alliance and Heng was elected as the Member of Parliament representing the Whampoa ward of Jalan Besar GRC. He served as Mayor of the Central District between 2001 and 2006.

On 12 August 2004, Heng was appointed Minister of State for Trade and Industry. On 1 May 2005, he was reappointed as Minister of State for National Development.

In the 2006 general election, Heng contested in Jalan Besar GRC again as part of a five-member PAP team and they won with 69.26% of the vote against the Singapore Democratic Alliance. After the election, Heng was appointed Minister of State for Health on 30 May 2006. On 1 April 2008, he became a Minister of State in the Prime Minister's Office.

During the 2011 general election, Heng contested as a solo PAP candidate in the newly formed Whampoa SMC and won with 66.1% of the vote against the National Solidarity Party's Ken Sun. On 21 May 2011, he was promoted to Senior Minister of State and continued serving in the Prime Minister's Office. On 31 May 2011, he also became Deputy Leader of the House in Parliament.

In the 2015 general election, Whampoa SMC was dissolved and became part of Jalan Besar GRC again. Heng contested in the election as part of a four-member PAP team in Jalan Besar GRC and won with 67.75% of the vote. Heng continued to be the Member of Parliament representing the Whampoa ward of Jalan Besar GRC after the election. On 1 May 2018, Heng was appointed as Senior Minister of State for Defence and has been holding that appointment since then after being elected again in the 2020 general election with 65.36% of the vote in Jalan Besar GRC.

Personal life
Heng is married to Goh Soon Poh, who is currently serving as Auditor-General of Singapore. She previously served as Deputy Secretary (Corporate) in the Ministry of Home Affairs (MHA) and the Prime Minister's Office (PMO). They have one daughter.

References

External links
 Heng Chee How on Parliament of Singapore

Singaporean people of Teochew descent
Living people
Harvard Kennedy School alumni
Alumni of Fitzwilliam College, Cambridge
1961 births
People's Action Party politicians
Singaporean Christians
Singaporean trade unionists
Members of the Parliament of Singapore